Waggoner Graveyard is a historic family cemetery located near Welcome, Davidson County, North Carolina.   It contains approximately 15 gravestones, with the earliest dated to 1820.  Burials continued into the early-20th century. It features a unique collection of folk gravestones by local stonecutters erected in Davidson County in the late-18th and first half of the 19th centuries.

It was listed on the National Register of Historic Places in 1984.

References

Cemeteries on the National Register of Historic Places in North Carolina
Cemeteries in Davidson County, North Carolina
National Register of Historic Places in Davidson County, North Carolina